Burkhard von Dallwitz (born 28 January 1959) is a German Australian composer based in Melbourne, best known for his score for 1998 American film The Truman Show.

Since 1984, he has worked as a composer for feature films, television and commercials in Australia, Germany and the United States.

Early life and education 
Dallwitz began ten years of classical piano training at the age of eight. By thirteen he was writing songs and music, and from fifteen, Dallwitz wrote, arranged and performed for various musical groups.

In 1979, Dallwitz moved to Australia where he studied music at Melbourne's La Trobe University. He majored with musical composition, and studied advanced composition under the tutelage of Keith Humble.

In 1996, he released his first CD recording of original instrumental works called Worlds Apart.

Underbelly theme and Olympics theme 
Dallwitz worked on the Nine Network Australia television series Underbelly and the UK.TV mini-series False Witness where he wrote the theme and the original musical score. He also composed the theme for the Seven Network's coverage of the Beijing 2008 Olympics (in addition to the 2000, 2002, 2004 and 2006 compositions) and more recently the soundtrack for the 2011 movie The Way Back.

Awards and nominations
In 1999, Burkhard and Philip Glass were awarded the Golden Globe for Best Original Score in a Motion Picture for The Truman Show. The score also won The Chicago Film Critics' Award and the ASCAP Film and Television Award, and the soundtrack reached number two on the Billboard chart.

In 2001 he won the APRA award for Best Television Theme for the Sydney Olympics in 2000. The world renowned 385 voice Mormon Tabernacle Choir performed and recorded his 2002 theme for the Salt Lake Winter Olympics. In 2004 he won the APRA-AGSC (Australian Guild of Screen Composers) Screen Music Award 'Best Music for a Television Series' for CrashBurn. Burkhard has several soundtrack albums out in general release.

APRA-AGSC Awards
The annual Screen Music Awards are presented by Australasian Performing Right Association (APRA) and Australian Guild of Screen Composers (AGSC) for television and film scores and soundtracks.

|-
|rowspan="2"| 2004 || "Episode 13" – CrashBurn  || Best Music for a Television Series or Serial || 
|-
| CrashBurn || Best Television Theme || 
|-
|rowspan="3"| 2006 || rowspan="2"| The Caterpillar Wish  || Feature Film Score of the Year || 
|-
| Best Soundtrack Album || 
|-
| Torino 2006 Winter Olympics || Best Television Theme || 
|-
|rowspan="3"| 2008 || "Episode 5" – Underbelly  || Best Music for a Television Series or Serial || 
|-
| Underbelly || Best Television Theme || 
|-
| "It’s a Jungle Out There" – Underbelly || Best Original Song Composed for the Screen || 
|-
|rowspan="2"| 2009 || False Witness || Best Music for a Mini-Series or Telemovie || 
|-
| "Episode 9 – Judas Kiss" – Underbelly: A Tale of Two Cities || Best Music for a Television Series or Serial ||

ARIA Music Awards
The ARIA Music Awards is an annual awards ceremony that recognises excellence, innovation, and achievement across all genres of Australian music. They commenced in 1987. 

! 
|-
| 2010
| Underbelly
|rowspan="2" |  Best Original Soundtrack, Cast or Show Album
| 
|rowspan="2" |  
|-
| 2019
| LOCUSTS: Original Motion Picture Soundtrack
| 
|}

References

External links
 

1959 births
APRA Award winners
Golden Globe Award-winning musicians
German emigrants to Australia
German film score composers
German male composers
German television composers
Living people
Male film score composers
Male television composers